Southern Pines Historic District is a national historic district located at Southern Pines, Moore County, North Carolina. The district encompasses 490 contributing buildings, 2 contributing sites, and 3 contributing structures in the town of Southern Pines.  It was developed between the 1883 and 1940 and includes notable examples of Queen Anne, Colonial Revival, and Bungalow / American Craftsman style architecture. Located in the district is the separately listed James Boyd House. Other notable buildings include Duncraig Manor, Loblolly, Seaboard Air Line Passenger Depot, Seaboard Air Line Freight Station, Sadelson Pharmacy-Tourist Building, Powell Furniture and Undertaking Building, Belvedere Hotel Building (1904), Arcade Building (1917), Princess Theatre / Carolina Theatre Building, Southern Pines Public Library (1939), U. S. Post Office (1937), First Baptist Church (1899), Church of Wide Fellowship (1927), and Emmanuel Episcopal Church (1926).

It was added to the National Register of Historic Places in 1991.

References

Historic districts on the National Register of Historic Places in North Carolina
Colonial Revival architecture in North Carolina
Queen Anne architecture in North Carolina
Buildings and structures in Moore County, North Carolina
National Register of Historic Places in Moore County, North Carolina